Pumpkinhead is a 1988 American supernatural horror film. It was the directorial debut of special effects artist Stan Winston. The film has built up a cult following since its release. The first in the Pumpkinhead franchise, it was followed by a direct-to-video sequel, two TV film sequels, and a comic book series. The film was originally called Vengeance: The Demon and it was inspired by a poem written by poet Ed Justin. The film inspired a video game called Bloodwings: Pumpkinhead's revenge.

A reboot is currently in the works from Paramount Players.

Plot 
In 1957, Tom Harley waits inside his farm cabin with his wife and his son, Ed. A doomed man seeks sanctuary at Tom's cabin, but Tom refuses and threatens to shoot him if he does not leave. Watching through a window, Ed witnesses the man caught and killed by a monster.

In the present, Ed Harley is a widowed father and owns a small store in the country. He leaves his young son, Billy, alone while he runs an errand. A group of teenage campers stop by at Harley's, and, while riding their dirt bikes, they mortally injure Billy. One teen, Steve, stays with the boy until his father's return; the rest flee the scene. At their cabin, the campers fight about whether or not to call the police. Joel, who is personally responsible for the boy's injury and is on probation for a similar incident, rips out the phone cord, knocks one of his friends unconscious and locks him and a girl in the closet to stop them from contacting the authorities.

Ed goes to see a witch and offers her gold, but she says that she cannot wake the dead. Instead, Ed says that he wants revenge; the witch agrees to help, but warns him that vengeance comes with a terrible price. On her orders, Ed goes to an old graveyard in the mountains, digs up a corpse, and brings it back to the witch's home. The witch uses blood from father and son to resurrect the corpse, which rises as a gigantic, spindly demonic monster referred to as "Pumpkinhead" by the locals.

Back at the cabin, Joel begins to experience remorse for his actions and decides to turn himself in to the police. The monster, however, has already arrived. One of the girls, Maggie, hears a voice whispering her name. Seemingly hypnotized, she follows the voice outside the cabin. Steve brings her out of her trance, but Pumpkinhead kills him. Ed experiences the murder through the monster's eyes. While the campers search for Steve, Pumpkinhead drags away Maggie, and Ed again experiences the ensuing murder. He returns to the witch and begs her to stop the monster's actions. The witch, however, tells him that nobody can stop Pumpkinhead and Ed will die if he interferes with the killing spree.

Joel confronts Pumpkinhead with a machete, but it swats him aside and drags Kim away, whom it drops from a fatal height. The three remaining campers unsuccessfully beg the locals for help. Ed arrives and shoots Pumpkinhead, but when Joel checks to see if the creature is still alive, it grabs a fallen rifle and impales him with it. A local boy, Bunt, helps the two remaining campers, Tracey and Chris, reach an abandoned church. Bunt relates the legend of the monster Pumpkinhead, explaining that the monster avenges one who was wronged. If anyone tries to stop Pumpkinhead or help his victims, that person becomes marked, too. Chris's dirt bike fails to start after Pumpkinhead removes the drive chain; he lifts up the bike, with Chris still on it, and throws it against a tree. He then drags Chris back to Harley's house, where Tracey, Bunt, and Ed have taken shelter.

Pumpkinhead captures Bunt. Ed stumbles out of the barn but is accidentally stabbed in the arm by a pitchfork. Both Ed and Pumpkinhead cry out in pain, and Pumpkinhead releases Bunt. Ed notices that Pumpkinhead's head is turning more human as Ed himself appears more monstrous, then realizes that he and Pumpkinhead are one; the only way for Ed to kill the monster is to die himself.

Pumpkinhead grabs Tracey by the neck, but before he can kill her, Ed shoots himself in the head. Pumpkinhead momentarily collapses to the ground, then grabs Bunt again. Tracey takes the gun and Ed begs her to finish him off. Ed, now fully metamorphosed, appears to menace Tracey. She shoots him until both he and Pumpkinhead fall to the ground dead. Tracey, Bunt, and Chris then watch as Pumpkinhead bursts into flames. Later that night, the witch buries Ed in Pumpkinhead's grave, ready to wait for the next person seeking revenge, and still wearing the necklace his son Billy made him.

Cast 
 Lance Henriksen as Ed Harley
 John D'Aquino as Joel
 Jeff East as Chris
 Kerry Remsen as Maggie
 Kimberly Ross as Kim
 Buck Flower as Mr. Wallace
 Mayim Bialik as Christine Wallace
 Joel Hoffman as Steve "Scratch"
 Cynthia Bain as Tracey
 Florence Schauffer as Haggis
 Brian Bremer as Bunt
 Matthew Hurley as Billy Harley
 Lee DeBroux as Tom Harley
 Madeleine Taylor Holmes as Old Hill Woman
 Tom Woodruff Jr. as Pumpkinhead
 Dick Warlock as Clayton Heller (man in the opening; credited as Richard Warlock)
 Mushroom as Gypsy

Production

Pumpkinhead was inspired by a poem by Ed Justin. The De Laurentiis Entertainment Group sent Stan Winston the script only expecting him to do the special creature effects, but Winston instead saw in the project as an opportunity to make it his directorial debut. Given Winston was then busy refining the story, he gave free reins regarding design to artists Alec Gillis, Shane Mahan, John Rosengrant and Tom Woodruff, Jr., the last of whom also wore the Pumpkinhead suit. Winston's experience regarding creature work enabled the effects not to use too much of the limited $3 million budget. Filming took place in Los Angeles, California.

Release 
The film was given a limited release theatrically in the United States by United Artists in October 1988 and again in January 1989. In total, it grossed $4,385,516 total at the domestic box office.

The film was released on VHS in the US by MGM/UA Home Entertainment in May 1989 and again in April 1995. MGM released the film on DVD twice: once in 2000 as a standard edition and again in 2008 in a 20th Anniversary Edition featuring an audio commentary and over an hour of featurettes. It was released on Blu-ray in September 2014.

Reception 
On review aggregator Rotten Tomatoes, Pumpkinhead holds an approval rating of 65%, based on 23 reviews, and an average rating of 5.73/10. Its consensus reads: "With effects work and solid direction from Stan Winston -- and Lance Henriksen adding welcome gravitas -- Pumpkinhead is a creature feature that stands a cut above".

Dave Kehr of the Chicago Tribune wrote: "As a technician, Winston clearly knows how to make a monster, but as a director he's yet to learn how to bring one to life". Richard Harrington of The Washington Post wrote that the film has poor writing and acting, but it is surprisingly polished for a B movie. Chris Willman of the Los Angeles Times wrote that, despite its poor writing, the premise is interesting, but it's not executed as well as Forbidden Planet. Empire rated it 2/5 stars and called it a Friday the 13th clone with "little atmosphere and no surprises". TV Guide rated it 2/5 stars and wrote that the film's second half becomes tedious because of its overdone slasher formula.

In a 1992 retrospective, Jon Nalick of the Los Angeles Times described it as "a well-executed film in a genre that is littered with dimwitted slasher flicks". Bloody Disgusting rated the film 4/5 stars and called it "a gothic story of love, loss, vengeance, and redemption". Joshua Siebalt of Dread Central rated the film 4/5 stars and wrote that film "stands as a timeless, dark fairy tale". Reviewing the 2000 DVD release, G. Noel Gross of DVD Talk rated it 3.5/5 stars and wrote that the film is "too good to pass over", despite its lackluster presentation. Nick Nunziata also criticized the 2000 DVD release and wrote that the film does not hold up. Nick Schager of The A.V. Club called it an endearing, pulp film that lacks subtlety. Reviewing the film on Blu-ray, Ken Hanley of Starlog said it is "one hell of an impressive directorial debut". Writing in Horror Films of the 1980s, critic John Kenneth Muir called it "a meditation on vengeance" that is "surprising and rewarding" for its rejection of vigilante justice, a popular theme in the 1980s.

Legacy 
Despite its poor box office results, Pumpkinhead has become a cult film. In 2013, Tyler Doupe included Pumpkinhead in his list of Underrated Horror Killers at Fearnet, and Fangoria included it in their 101 Best Horror Movies You've Never Seen.

Sequels and reboot 
A sequel, Pumpkinhead II: Blood Wings, was released directly to video in 1994. It was directed by Jeff Burr. Two additional sequels, Pumpkinhead: Ashes to Ashes and Pumpkinhead: Blood Feud, were filmed in 2006 as made for television movies. They were broadcast on Syfy in October 2006 and on February 2007, respectively.

A reboot of the series has been reported and was to be produced by Saw executive producer Peter Block. Nate Atkins was set to write the script for the reboot. Paramount Players currently develops the film as of November 2021, with a script already written and news of who will direct to be announced "in the coming months".

Comic book 
In 1993, Dark Horse Comics published a Pumpkinhead comic book series called Pumpkinhead: The Rites of Exorcism. The comic was supposed to be a four-part mini-series but only two issues were published. The second one ended in a cliffhanger leaving readers with the prospect of a winged Pumpkinhead that would have appeared in the third issue.

Dynamite Entertainment began publishing a five issue Pumpkinhead limited series, written by Cullen Bunn and illustrated by Blacky Shepherd, in February 2018.

Video game 
In 1995, Electronic Arts published a first-person shooter computer game for Microsoft Windows called Bloodwings: Pumpkinhead's Revenge. The game was poorly received.

Model kits 
In 1991, GEOmetric Design, Inc. produced and marketed the first licensed Pumpkinhead model kit. It featured the demon on a display base depicting a portion of a burned out church. The model kit was sculpted by American artist Randy Bowen. The kit was discontinued when GEOmetric Design released its "Pumpkinhead: The Metamorphosis" kit in 1994. Sculpted by Japanese artist Takayuki Takeya (竹谷 隆之), the second kit was based on the Pumpkinhead sequel story written by Carducci and Gerani and published in the Dark Horse Comics series. The kit included a glossy, full-color booklet that concluded the cancelled comic.

In 2005, Sideshow Collectibles released a Pumpkinhead maquette.

Music 
The horror punk band The Misfits released a song entitled "Pumpkin Head", which was featured on their album Famous Monsters, released in 1999.

The song "Vengeance the Demon/Close the Door/Out Crowd" by the horror folk punk band Harley Poe was featured on their 2013 album "Pagan Holiday". This song includes descriptions of the Pumpkinhead legend.

See also
List of ghost films
List of monster movies

References

External links 
 
 
 

1988 films
1988 horror films
1988 fantasy films
1988 independent films
American dark fantasy films
Folk horror films
American independent films
American monster movies
Pumpkinhead (film series)
Demons in film
Fictional demons and devils
Fictional undead
American films about revenge
Films shot in Los Angeles
American supernatural horror films
Films about witchcraft
Films set in 1957
United Artists films
Films directed by Stan Winston
Films scored by Richard Stone (composer)
De Laurentiis Entertainment Group films
Films adapted into comics
Southern Gothic films
1980s monster movies
American vigilante films
American exploitation films
1988 directorial debut films
1980s English-language films
1980s American films